Campion School may refer to:

England
Campion School, Bugbrooke
Campion School, Hornchurch
Campion School, Leamington Spa

Greece
Campion School (Athens)

India 
Campion School, Mumbai
Campion School, Bhopal
Campion Anglo-Indian Higher Secondary School, Trichy

United States
Campion High School, Wisconsin
Campion Academy, Loveland, Colorado